The Perené River is a Peruvian river on the eastern slopes of the South American Andes.

Rivers of Peru
Tributaries of the Ucayali River
Rivers of Junín Region